This article gives information on the five protected heritage sites in Wasseiges, Belgium. These are also part of Belgian National Heritage. The below table gives information on the site, Town, Coordinates, Number and an image (if available).

|}

See also 
 List of protected heritage sites in Liège (province)

References

Sources
 Belgian heritage register: Direction générale opérationnelle - Aménagement du territoire, Logement, Patrimoine et Energie (DG4)
 www.dglive.be

Wasseiges